John G. Levi is the current Board Chair of the Legal Services Corporation and a member of the American Academy of Arts and Sciences. He was nominated to serve on the Board by President Barack Obama on August 6, 2009, and his nomination was confirmed by the U.S. Senate on March 19, 2010. He was elected Chairman of the LSC Board by his fellow Board members on April 7, 2010.

Levi played a pivotal role in Obama's early career. Barack met his future wife Michelle Obama at the Chicago law firm Sidley Austin, where Levi is a partner. Newton N. Minow describes his and Levi's role in bringing the two together:  "My daughter Martha called to say that one of her best students, Barack Obama, wanted to spend the summer as a law firm associate in Chicago," said Minow, referring to his daughter, law professor Martha Minow. "I called our partner John Levi, who heads our recruiting for the firm, and suggested this; John laughed and told me that he had already heard about Barack and had already hired him."

Levi was born in Chicago, Illinois. His father was Edward H. Levi, a former president of the University of Chicago and United States Attorney General under President Gerald R. Ford. He received an undergraduate degree from the University of Rochester with honors in 1969. He received his J.D. degree in 1972, and his LL.M. in 1973, from Harvard Law School. His brother David F. Levi is the 14th Dean of Duke Law School. His cousin Daniel Meltzer served as Principal Deputy White House Counsel in the Obama Administration. His brother Michael is a scientist in both particle physics and cosmology at the Lawrence Berkeley National laboratory in Berkeley. His eldest son, Ben Levi, is the founder of legal technology startup InCloudCounsel.

References

1948 births
Living people
Fellows of the American Academy of Arts and Sciences
Harvard Law School alumni
20th-century American Jews
Legal Services Corporation
People associated with Sidley Austin
University of Rochester alumni
21st-century American Jews